Michael Mann FBA (born 1942) is a British-born emeritus professor of sociology at the University of California, Los Angeles (UCLA) and at the University of Cambridge.  Mann holds dual British and United States citizenships. He received a B.A. in modern history in 1963 and a D.Phil. in sociology in 1971 from the University of Oxford.

Mann has been a professor of Sociology at UCLA since 1987; he was lecturer in Sociology at the University of Essex after graduation. He then became reader in Sociology at the London School of Economics and Political Science, from 1977 to 1987. Mann was also a member of the Advisory Editors Council of the Social Evolution & History journal.

In 1984, Mann published The Autonomous Power of the State: its Origins, Mechanisms, and Results in the European Journal of Sociology. Mann's works include The Sources of Social Power (four volumes) and The Dark Side of Democracy, spanning the entire 20th century. He also published Incoherent Empire, in which he attacks the United States' 'War on Terror' as a clumsy experiment in neo-imperialism.

The last two volumes of The Sources of Social Power, Global Empires and Revolution 1890-1945 and Globalizations 1945-2011, were published by CUP in 2012 and 2013 respectively. Mann's work has been subject of several books, including J.A. Hall and R. Schroder (eds). The Anatomy of Power: Social Theory of Michael Mann, (Cambridge UP, 2006) and R. Schroder (ed.) Global Powers: Michael Mann's Anatomy of 20th century and Beyond, (Cambridge UP, 2016).

Mann was elected as a Corresponding Fellow of the British Academy in 2015.

Selected publications
 Consciousness and Action Among the Western Working Class 1981. 
The Autonomous Power of the State. European Sociology Archives, 1984.
 The Sources of Social Power: Volume 1, A History of Power from the Beginning to AD 1760, Cambridge University Press, 1986. 
 The Sources of Social Power: Volume 2, The Rise of Classes and Nation States 1760-1914, Cambridge University Press, 1993. 
 Incoherent Empire, Verso, 2003. 
 Fascists.  Cambridge: Cambridge University Press, 2004.  .
 The Dark Side of Democracy: Explaining Ethnic Cleansing. Cambridge: Cambridge University Press, 2005.  .
(2011)Power in the 21st Century: Conversations with John A. Hall. Polity, 184pp.
 The Sources of Social Power: Volume 3, Global Empires and Revolution, 1890-1945, Cambridge University Press, 2012. .
 The Sources of Social Power: Volume 4, Globalizations, 1945-2011, Cambridge University Press, 2012. .

References

External links
Professor Michael Mann - UCLA Department of Sociology webpage
Conversation with Michael Mann - UC Berkeley transcript and webcast of interview with Michael Mann regarding his recent publication, Incoherent Empire.
 Nations and Nationalism: Debate on Mann's The Dark Side of Democracy: Explaining Ethnic Cleansing, with J. Breuilly, D. Cesarani, S. Malesevic, B. Neuberger and M. Mann (abstract).
 - Review of Mann's The Dark Side of Democracy by T.K. Vogel in the Neue Zürcher Zeitung, September 17, 2005 
Political Studies Review, Special Issue dedicated to Michael Mann's Fascists and The Dark Side of Democracy, September 2006 - Vol. 4 Issue 3 Page 247-395
Webcast of Michael Mann in the conference "The Social and Political Relevance of Gellner's Thought Today" held at the *National University of Ireland, Galway in May 2005.
 Interviewed by Alan Macfarlane 18th July 2005 (video)
The dark side of democracy: explaining ethnic cleansing LSE NN Debate on The Dark Side of Democracy (2005) 

1942 births
Living people
British emigrants to the United States
British sociologists
Alumni of the University of Oxford
University of California, Los Angeles faculty
Academics of Queen's University Belfast
Scholars of nationalism
Scholars of war
Corresponding Fellows of the British Academy
World historians